László Bartha is the name of: 

 László Bartha (athlete, born 1925) (1925–1982), Hungarian sprinter
 László Bartha (footballer) (born 1987), Hungarian footballer